The Surface Pro 6 is a 2-in-1 detachable tablet computer developed by Microsoft. It is the sixth generation of Surface Pro and was announced alongside the Surface Laptop 2 on October 2, 2018 at an event in New York. It was released on 16th of that same month.

Configurations

Features

Hardware 
This sixth generation Surface computer line has all been updated to Intel's eighth generation Kaby Lake Refresh Core-i5 and Core-i7 CPUs. It is available with either 8 or 16 GB of RAM, 128 GB, 256 GB, 512 GB or 1 TB of Solid State Storage, and business or consumer models. Business models are pre-installed with Windows 10 Pro while Consumer SKUs are pre-installed with Windows 10 Home.

The port configuration on the Surface Pro 6 remains the same as previous generations with one Surface Connect, USB 3.0 type-A port, one Mini DisplayPort, a 3.5 mm headphone jack, and a microSD card reader. Unlike the Surface Go, a USB-C port is not present on the Surface Pro 6. The optional Surface type cover attaches to a magnetic pin port at the bottom of the device which is identical physically to the previous Surface Pro model.

The Surface Pro 6 features a 12.3 inch PixelSense display with a resolution of 2736x1824. Unlike its predecessors, that used Sharp sourced displays, the Surface Pro 6 display is made by LG.

The Surface Pro 6 brings back the Matte Black color option, an option previously not seen since the original Surface Pro.

When the brightness is changed to 200 nits, the Surface Pro 6 draws 5W of power. When being charged, the Surface Pro 6 has three different power modes to change how it draws power: Suggested, Better Performance, and Best Performance. When the Surface Pro 6 is not being charged, it adds another power mode in: Battery Saver, Recommended, Better Performance, Best Performance. The battery life on the Surface Pro 6 comes in at 9 hours.

Software 

All consumer configurations of the Surface Pro 6 are pre-installed with Windows 10 Home 64-bit. Business configurations are pre-installed with Windows 10 Pro. Both include 30-day trials of Microsoft Office 365.

Accessories 

 An optional Type Cover covered with Alcantara material available in four different colors. 
 An optional Surface pen with tilt support and up to 4,096 levels of pressure sensitivity and is available in four different colors.
 There are two styles of Surface mouse available in three colors. They are the Surface Mobile Mouse and the Surface Arc Mouse. 
 The Surface Pro 6 is compatible with the Surface dial for additional shortcuts and functionality.
 An optional USB-C adapter which attaches to the docking/AC adapter "Surface Connect" port. The adapter supports USB 3, Display Port alternate mode, and charging via USB Power Delivery.

Reception 

The Surface Pro 6 received generally favourable reviews, with many reviewers praising its high performance and long battery life; however, it was criticised for lacking USB-C ports.

Timeline

References

External links 
 
  

Microsoft Surface
2-in-1 PCs